Ryan Nemeth (born November 4, 1984) is an American professional wrestler, writer, actor, and comedian who is currently signed to All Elite Wrestling (AEW). He is also known for his appearances under the ring name Briley Pierce in WWE, where he wrestled in their developmental territory NXT.

Professional wrestling career

Ohio Valley Wrestling (2010–2011)
Nemeth won the promotion's first ever Breakout competition and received a one-year paid scholarship with Ohio Valley Wrestling (OVW). In 2010, Nemeth made his professional debut for OVW under his real name. On January 8, 2011, Nemeth and Christopher Silvio defeated The Elite (Ted McNaler and Adam Revolver) to win the OVW Southern Tag Team Championship in Louisville, Kentucky.

On February 2, 2011, after Nemeth was attacked by Fighting Spirit (Silvio and Raphael Constantine), Jim Cornette vacated the titles. On the same night, Nemeth and Paredyse defeated Fighting Spirit in a tag team elimination match to win the vacated Tag Team Championship. On March 5, 2011, Nemeth and Paredyse lost the Tag Team Championship to Silvio and Constantine.

WWE (2011–2013)

Florida Championship Wrestling (2011–2012)
Nemeth signed a developmental contract with World Wrestling Entertainment and was assigned to its developmental territory Florida Championship Wrestling (FCW). He made his debut on June 26, 2011 as Briley Pierce, facing Big E Langston in a losing effort. On the October 30, 2011, episode of FCW Television Pierce was defeated by Brad Maddox after being pinned with the Oklahoma roll. On November 3, 2011, Pierce and Brad Maddox defeated C.J. Parker and Donnie Marlow to win the FCW Florida Tag Team Championships. On February 2, 2012, Pierce and Maddox were forced to vacate the titles due to Pierce suffering a leg injury.  Bo Rotundo and Husky Harris defeated Maddox and Eli Cottonwood for the vacant titles that night.

NXT (2012–2013)
Before WWE, NXT merged with FCW as NXT Wrestling. Nemeth, as Briley Pierce, debuted on the June 20, 2012, episode of NXT taped at Full Sail University as an interviewer.

Pierce made his in-ring debut on the May 8 episode of NXT against Sakamoto, but both men were attacked by Conor O'Brian; this led to both men challenging O'Brian to a handicap match during the next episode, which O'Brian won. On May 17, 2013, Pierce was released; his last match was a battle royal on the May 29 episode of NXT (which was taped before his release) to determine the #1 contender for the NXT Championship where he and Sakamoto were the first men eliminated from the match by Mason Ryan.

Independent circuit (2013–present)
Nemeth had his first match after his WWE release on May 25, 2013, at Florida Underground Wrestling Throwdown 3, defeating Jesse Neal. On June 23, 2016 Nemeth won the DDT
Ironman Heavymetalweight Championship, defeating Bunny the Cat by forfeit. He would lose the title on the same day to Taya Valkyrie.

All Elite Wrestling (2021–present)
Nemeth made his All Elite Wrestling debut on the January 27, 2021 episode of AEW Dynamite in a losing effort against Hangman Page. On the February 9 episode of AEW Dark, Nemeth earned his first victory in AEW when he defeated Marko Stunt establishing himself as a heel. The following night on Dynamite, Nemeth was defeated by Pac. On the February 23 episode of AEW Dark, Nemeth defeated Aaron Solo and aligned himself with Peter Avalon and Cezar Bononi.

Personal life
Nemeth has two brothers. His older brother Nick is also a professional wrestler, who currently performs for WWE under the ring name Dolph Ziggler. His younger brother Donald was sentenced to 15 years in jail after pleading guilty to involuntary manslaughter, kidnapping, and robbery for his role in a botched robbery attempt that led to the murder of a former Marine in January 2016.

Championships and accomplishments
Dramatic Dream Team
Ironman Heavymetalweight Championship (1 time)
Florida Championship Wrestling
FCW Florida Tag Team Championship (1 time) – with Brad Maddox
Ohio Valley Wrestling
OVW Southern Tag Team Championship (2 times) – with Christopher Silvio (1) and Paredyse (1)
Pro Wrestling Illustrated
Ranked No. 491 of the top 500 singles wrestlers in the PWI 500 in 2021

References

External links

1984 births
21st-century American writers
21st-century professional wrestlers
All Elite Wrestling personnel
American male comedians
American male professional wrestlers
American male sport wrestlers
American people of Hungarian descent
Living people
Male actors from Cleveland
Professional wrestlers from Ohio
Sportspeople from Cleveland
Ironman Heavymetalweight Champions
FCW Florida Tag Team Champions